Bath and North East Somerset (commonly referred to as BANES or B&NES) is a unitary authority created on 1 April 1996, following the abolition of the County of Avon, which had existed since 1974. It stretches from the outskirts of Bristol, south into the Mendip Hills and east to the southern Cotswold Hills and Wiltshire border. The city of Bath is the principal settlement in the district, but BANES also covers Keynsham, Midsomer Norton, Radstock and the Chew Valley. The area has a population of 170,000, about half of whom live in Bath, making it 12 times more densely populated than the rest of the area.

A scheduled monument is a nationally important archaeological site or monument which is given legal protection by being placed on a list (or "schedule") by the Secretary of State for Culture, Media and Sport; Historic England takes the leading role in identifying such sites. The legislation governing this is the Ancient Monuments and Archaeological Areas Act 1979. The term "monument" can apply to the whole range of archaeological sites, and they are not always visible above ground. Such sites have to have been deliberately constructed by human activity. They range from prehistoric standing stones and burial sites, through Roman remains and medieval structures such as castles and monasteries, to later structures such as industrial sites and buildings constructed for the World Wars or the Cold War.

There are 58 scheduled monuments in Bath and North East Somerset. Some of the oldest are Neolithic, including the Stanton Drew stone circles and several tumuli. The Great Circle at Stanton Drew is one of the largest Neolithic monuments ever built, and the second largest stone circle in Britain (after Avebury). The date of construction is not known but is thought to be between 3000 and 2000 BCE, which places it in the Late Neolithic to Early Bronze Age. There are also several Iron Age hillforts such as Maes Knoll, which was later incorporated into the medieval Wansdyke defensive earthwork, several sections of which are included in this list. The Romano-British period is represented with several sites, most notably the Roman Baths and city walls in Bath. More recent sites include several bridges which date from the Middle Ages to the 18th-century Palladian bridge in Prior Park Landscape Garden.  Dundas Aqueduct, built in 1805 to carry the Kennet and Avon Canal, is the most recent site in the list. The monuments are listed below using the names given in the English Heritage data sheets.

Monuments

|}

See also
 Scheduled monuments in Somerset
 Grade I listed buildings in Bath and North East Somerset
 Grade II* listed buildings in Bath and North East Somerset

Notes

References

Bath and North East Somerset
Archaeological sites in Somerset
History of Somerset
Scheduled monuments in Bath and North East Somerset
Articles containing video clips
Bath
Scheduled